Muhammad Asimi (September 1, 1920 – July 29, 1996), was a Soviet and Tajik philosopher, soldier, poet, and academic.

Born in Khujand, Asimi graduated from Samarkand State University (1941). In 1990 he founded the Payvand (Пайванд) Society, a cultural organization for scholarly relations between the Persian-speaking peoples, for which he was active until his death. 

Asimi was killed in Dushanbe on 29 July 1996 during the Tajikistani Civil War. A documentary was released in 2018, by Emmy award winner Chris Schueler, covering his life and accomplishments.

Selected bibliography
 Material and Physical Description of the World, 1966
 Russian-Tajik dictionary, 1966
 Satiser and the World's Physical Image, 1966
 Origin of Philosophical Thinking, 1970
 Avicenna and world culture, Journal of peoples of Asia and Africa, 1980
 Traditional progress socioeconomic role, 1987
 Historical Progress of socialist nations, 1987
 IV: The age of achievement: AD 750 to the end of the fifteenth century - Part One: The historical, social and economic setting , Paris 1998 (General and Regional Histories)
 Connecting Hearts Connecting Generations
 Osimī, Muḥammad S. Ethnic history of Central Asia in the 2nd millennium BC: Soviet studies. Tipogr. Izd. Nauka, 1977.
 Khān, Muḥammad Ḥakīm, Akhror Mukhtarov, and Muḣammad Osimī. Muntakhab al-tavārīkh. Akādimī-i ʻUlūm-i Tājīkistān-i Shūravī, Instītū-yi Tārīkh bi-nām-i Aḥmad Dānish, 1983.
 Asimi, Muhammad, and Instituti Sharqshinosi Tojikiston. "Aktual Nye Problemy Filosofskoi I Obshchestvennoi Mysli Zarubezhnogo Vostoka Materialy Pervogo Vsesoiuznogo Koordinatsionnogo Soveshchaniia." (1983).
 Hān, Muḥammad Ḥakīm, Achror M. Muchtarov, and Muḩammad Osimī. Muntachab at-tavarich: v 2 knigach. Izdat. Doniš, 1983.
 Osimī, Muḩammad. Tadshikistan. APN-Verlag, 1987.
 De Laet, S. J., A. H. Dani, M. A. Al-Bakhit, J. L. Lorenzo, Muḣammad Osimī, Louis Bazin, R. B. Nunoo et al. History of Humanity: From the Seventh Century to the Sixteenth Century. Routledge, 2000.
 Osimī, Muḩammad. Tašakkul wa takāmul-i afkār-i falsafī. ʻIrfān, 1981.
 Al-Asimi, Muhammad Saud Muhammad. "Depository institutions: Reforms along the lines of Islamic banking principles." (1995): 1052-1052.
 Asimi, Muhammad, Ibrahimovich(father's name) and Instituti Sharqshinosi Tojikiston. "Aktual Nye Problemy Filosofskoi I Obshchestvennoi Mysli Zarubezhnogo Vostoka Materialy Pervogo Vsesoiuznogo Koordinatsionnogo Soveshchaniia." (1983).

References

1920 births
1996 deaths
People from Khujand
Corresponding Members of the Russian Academy of Sciences
Corresponding Members of the USSR Academy of Sciences
Members of the Tajik Academy of Sciences
Seventh convocation members of the Soviet of Nationalities
Eighth convocation members of the Soviet of the Union
Ninth convocation members of the Soviet of the Union
Tenth convocation members of the Soviet of the Union
Eleventh convocation members of the Soviet of the Union
Recipients of the Order of Lenin
Recipients of the Order of the Red Banner of Labour
Recipients of the Order of the Red Star
Soviet philosophers
Tajikistani philosophers
People executed by firearm